Edward Mansfield Brockbank MBE (3 March  1866 - 2 January 1959) was a cardiologist and surgeon closely associated with the Manchester Royal Infirmary. He was a prolific author of medical textbooks and works of medical history and biography and contributed a number of articles to the Dictionary of National Biography.

Early life and family
Edward Brockbank was born in Geelong, Australia, on 3 March 1866, to John Thomas Brockbank, a metal merchant, and Charlotte Sadler. Of Quaker background, he was taken to England at the age of 4 and educated at the Bootham School, York, and Owens College, Manchester, later known as the Victoria University of Manchester, from where he received the degree of Doctor of Medicine in 1890.

Brockbank married his first cousin, Mary Ellwood Brockbank, in 1899. There were two daughters and three sons from the marriage. Their son William also became a physician and medical historian.

Career
Brockbank had resident posts at the Manchester Royal Infirmary (MRI) and Birmingham General Hospital. He was also a junior physician at the Royal Children's Hospital. After that he returned to the MRI as honorary assistant physician and lecturer in materia medica. In 1912 he was appointed lecturer in clinical medicine and dean of medical studies.

He was made a member of the Order of the British Empire for his work on the prevention of cancer in mule spinners.

He was a prolific author of medical textbooks and works of medical history and wrote medical biographies for the Dictionary of National Biography.

Death and legacy
Brockbank retired from medicine in 1926. He died on 2 January 1959.

Selected publications
 The Murmurs of Mitral Disease
 Sketches of the Lives and Work of the Honorary Medical Staff of the Manchester Infirmary: From Its Foundation in 1752 to 1830, When It Became the Royal Infirmary
 Dreschfeld Memorial Volume, Containing an Account of the Life, Work, and Writings of the Late Julius Dreschfeld: With a Series of Original Articles ... and Former Pupils
 Life Insurance and General Practice
 The Manchester Medical Society and the Literary and Philosophical Society of Manchester
 A Short History of Cheadle Royal, from its foundation in 1766 for the humane treatment of mental disease
 John Dalton. Experimental Physiologist And Would-Be Physician.
 The Foundation Of Provincial Medical Education In England (And Of The Manchester School In Particular)
 The Conduct of Life Assurance Examinations
 A Centenary History of the Manchester Medical Society
 On Gall-Stones or Cholelithiasis
 The Diagnosis and Treatment of Heart Disease: Practical Points for Students and Practitioners
 John Ferriar: public health work, Tristram Shandy, other essay and verses. William Osler: his interest in Ferriar, biographical notes.
 Heart Sounds and Murmurs, their Causation and Recognition. A handbook for students
 The Clinical Examination of Diseases of the Lungs
 Children - Their Care and Management

References 

1866 births
1959 deaths
Fellows of the Royal College of Surgeons
Members of the Order of the British Empire
Contributors to the Dictionary of National Biography
Physicians of the Manchester Royal Infirmary
People from Geelong
Australian surgeons
Australian emigrants to England
People educated at Bootham School
Australian Quakers
Alumni of the Victoria University of Manchester
Australian cardiologists
British medical writers
British medical historians
Fellows of the Royal College of Physicians